Valya is a given name. Notable holders include:

 Valya (singer) (born 1978), Bulgarian pop folk singer
 Valya Balkanska (born 1942), Bulgarian folk music singer
 Valya Dudycz Lupescu (born 1974), Ukrainian American writer
 Valya Samvelyan, Armenian female folk-singer

See also
 Valya algebra